Amir Khorram is an Iranian engineer and political activist.

He was a senior member of the Freedom Movement of Iran, and one of its central committee members.

Khorram had been arrested several times and spend more than ten years in prison for his political activities between 2001 and 2016.

Views 
Khorram maintains that political groups such as Freedom Movement of Iran keep discontented people from turning against the establishment, metaphorically comparing them to a "moat" that prevents people from leaving a "castle" (Iranian regime).

References

 Profile at Iran Prison Atlas Project

1963 births
Living people
Heads of youth wing of the Freedom Movement of Iran
Amnesty International prisoners of conscience held by Iran
Shiraz University alumni